James Okwuosa (born 14 September 1990) is a Nigerian professional footballer who plays as a defender for Malaysia Super League club PDRM. He made his debut for the Super Eagles of Nigeria as a substitute in the August 2013 during a match against South Africa in the Mandela cup - a match the Eagles won 2-0. He subsequently played during a friendly match with Burkina Faso in Kaduna - a match the Eagles won 4-1. His first competitive match was when he came on as a substitute for Emmanuel Emenike in the 93rd minute during the 13 October 2013 world cup qualifier match against Ethiopia in Addis Ababa.

References

External links
 
 

1990 births
Living people
Nigerian footballers
Nigeria international footballers
Association football defenders
Chippa United F.C. players
Qadsia SC players
Nigerian expatriate sportspeople in Kuwait
Expatriate footballers in Kuwait
Kuwait Premier League players
Lobi Stars F.C. players
Rangers International F.C. managers
Al-Shabab SC (Kuwait) players